Inclusion Hill is a prominent steeply conical hill,  high, between McDonald Beach and the Mount Bird icecap on Ross Island, Antarctica. It is a trachyte plug, in parts containing numerous inclusions of basalt. The hill was explored and descriptively named by the New Zealand Geological Survey Antarctic Expedition, 1958–59.

References

Hills of Ross Island